HMS Cormorant was probably launched in 1780 at Plymouth, Massachusetts. She was commissioned as the Massachusetts privateer Rattlesnake in 1781. The Royal Navy captured her shortly after she set out on a cruise and purchased her. In November 1781 she carried to England the first news of General Cornwallis's defeat. The Royal Navy registered her under the name Cormorant. In 1783 the navy renamed her Rattlesnake. It paid her off and sold her in 1786.

Privateer Rattlesnake
Rattlesnake was probably drawn by John Peck of Boston, Massachusetts, and probably built at Plymouth in 1780. Rattlesnake had the appearance of a miniature frigate, with detached quarterdeck and forecastle.

Rattlesnake was commissioned on 12 June 1781 under Commander Mark Clark (or Clarke). She had barely begun her first cruise when she encountered the 44-gun frigate , Captain James Cumming.

Assurance captured Rattlesnake on 17 June. He sent her into New York, where she arrived on 8 July. The Royal Navy purchased her on 28 July at Boston.

HMS Rattlesnake
Captain John Melcombe assumed command in September, sailed to England on 29 October, and arrived in late November. Melcombe arrived at the Admiralty on the Sunday evening before 27 November, bearing the news that General Cornwallis had surrendered at Yorktown. (All the reports of Melcombe's arrival refer to him as Captain of His Majesty's sloop Rattlesnake.)

The Navy registered Rattlesnake on 30 November, as HMS Cormorant, there being a  already in service, and  just having been lost.

HMS Cormorant

Cormorant underwent fitting at Plymouth between November 1781 and February 1782. On 19 July 1782 Cormorant recaptured Marine. On 2 July Marine, Rendel, master, had put Torbay, having been chased near Plymouth by a French privateer while Marine was sailing from Darmouth to Ireland.

She was armed with ten 6-pounder guns and had a crew of 50 men under the command of lieutenant de fregate LeFer. She was nine days out of Brest and taking dispatches to the combined fleets. Before he struck Le Fer threw overboard the dispatches, her logbook and papers, and eight guns. She then arrived at Cork.

In August 1783 the Navy renamed Cormorant Rattlesnake, and Commander John Melcombe recommissioned her.

HMS Rattlesnake
On 3 November 1783 Rattlesnake sailed for the Mediterranean.

On 10 November 1784, Rattlesnake, Captain Melcombe, was escorting the merchantman Countess of Tuscany to Gibraltar when they encountered an Algerine naval squadron of nine ships under the command of an admiral. The Algerine admiral pretended to believe that Rattlesnake was not a British warship and compelled both vessels to put into Algiers. There the Dey of Algiers detained them for five days before releasing them, without apology.

On 29 November 1785 Commander Thomas Hamilton replaced Melcome.

Fate
In July 1786, Rattlesnake was paid off. She was sold on 10 October.

Notes, citations, and references
Notes

Citations

References
 
 New Jersey Archives: Documents Relating to the Revolutionary History of the State of New Jersey (1977) Series 2, Vol.5 (AMS Press; New Jersey Historical Society)

External links
 

1780 ships
Ships built in the United States
Captured ships
Sloops of the Royal Navy